State Route 490 (SR 490) is a state highway in White Pine County, Nevada. The route serves a state prison north of Ely.

Route description

The route begins at the entrance to the Ely State Prison, a maximum-security penitentiary north of Ely. SR 490 then cuts through a short mountain gap and turns nearly due south. After another , the route turns easterly at a T-intersection. SR 490 then travels about  further to the southeast to reach its terminus at a junction on U.S. Route 93 northeast of Ely and just south of the Ely Airport.

History
SR 490 was added to the state highway system on January 17, 1992.

Major intersections

See also

References

490
Transportation in White Pine County, Nevada